Rui de Gouveia Pinto Rodrigues (born 17 May 1943) is a Portuguese retired football player and manager. He played as a centre back.

Over the course of 17 seasons, Rodrigues amassed Portuguese top division totals of 338 games and 21 goals, representing Académica de Coimbra (two spells), S.L. Benfica and Vitória de Guimarães.

Club career
Born in Lourenço Marques, Portuguese Mozambique, Rodrigues started at Grupo Desportivo 1º de Maio, after an unsuccessful try-out at Ferroviário de Lourenço Marques. In 1962, he travelled to Portugal for a training session with the under-18 national team. Only a few months later, at the start of 1962–63 season, he joined Académica de Coimbra. First with José Maria Pedroto and then with Mário Wilson, Rodrigues spent 9 seasons in Coimbra, helping them reach a fourth place in 1964–65 and a club record second place in 1964–67, plus reaching two Portuguese Cup finals, in 1967 and 1969.

In 1971, after years of refusing offers from larger clubs, he accepted a move to Benfica. He made his debut on 12 September 1971, in a home win to Porto and played a total of 25 matches throughout the season, winning a league and cup double, and reached the semi-final of the European Cup.  During his spell at Benfica, he suffered minor injuries that hinder his progress in the team and with competition from Messias and others, the 31-year old chose to leave Benfica in 1974.

He then joined Vitória de Guimarães for two seasons, playing all of the league games in 1974–75 and receiving the captain armband in the following year, which ended with another Portuguese Cup final lost. Rodrigues returned to Académica in 1976, playing only 33 league appearances over three years, five of those in 1978–79 and with the team suffering relegation, the 36-year-old retired from football. In the following four years, he managed several teams, notably Leça and Beira-Mar (twice), returning to Benfica in 1995 on invitation of Artur Jorge to coach the under-12, winning the Campeonato Nacional de Infantis.

International career
Rodrigues gained 12 caps for Portugal, nine as an Académica player. He made his debut on 26 November 1967 against Bulgaria, in a 0–1 loss in Sofia for the UEFA Euro 1968 qualifiers.

Rodrigues' last appearance was on 16 October 1976 against Poland, in a 0–2 home defeat for the 1978 FIFA World Cup qualification campaign.

|}

Honours
Académica
Taça de Portugal: Runner-up 1966–67, 1968–68

Benfica
Primeira Liga: 1971–72, 1972–73
Taça de Portugal: 1971–72

Vitória de Guimarães
Taça de Portugal: Runner-up 1975–76

References
General
 

Specific

External links

1943 births
Living people
Sportspeople from Maputo
Portuguese footballers
Association football defenders
Primeira Liga players
Associação Académica de Coimbra – O.A.F. players
S.L. Benfica footballers
Vitória S.C. players
Portugal international footballers
Portuguese football managers
S.C. Beira-Mar managers